Eriogonum strictum is a species of wild buckwheat known by the common name Blue Mountain buckwheat. It is a common plant of western North America from northern California to British Columbia where it is found along rocky slopes and scrubland. It flowers early in the summer.

Description
The woolly, oval-shaped leaves near the base are one to four centimeters long.

The slender inflorescence stalks are naked but usually woolly and produce flower clusters at the top. The flowers are pale yellow, and darken to reddish or orange.

References

External links

Jepson Manual Treatment - Eriogonum strictum
Eriogonum strictum - Photo gallery

strictum
Flora of the West Coast of the United States
Flora of British Columbia
Flora of California
Flora of the Sierra Nevada (United States)
Flora without expected TNC conservation status